"Snoop Dogg (What's My Name II)" is the follow-up for one of the first singles released by rapper Snoop Dogg, "Who Am I? (What's My Name?)." It was also the only CD single released from his fifth album, Tha Last Meal. The music video is directed by Chris Robinson. It was produced by Timbaland and briefly features Dr. Dre, who is sat on a couch portrayed as a pimp with Snoop Dogg. Nate Dogg and Lady of Rage provide vocals in the chorus.

Track listing 
Vinyl
Snoop Dogg (Explicit) — 4:10
Snoop Dogg (Instrumental) — 4:12
Back Up Ho (Explicit) — 4:19

Chart performance 
The song peaked at  number 77 on the Billboard Hot 100 and at  number 13 on the UK Singles Chart.

Music video 
The music video was shot in Vancouver, British Columbia, Canada. The intro of the music video was filmed on location in front of The Penthouse Gentleman's Club.

Charts

References

Snoop Dogg songs
2000 singles
2000 songs
Song recordings produced by Timbaland
Songs written by Snoop Dogg
Gangsta rap songs
G-funk songs